John "Jack" Short (18 February 1928 – 10 October 1976) was an English footballer who played in the Football League for Barnsley, Stoke City and Wolverhampton Wanderers.

Career
Short was born in Darfield, near Barnsley. He attended Great Houghton Council School and later Darfield Foulstone Modern School, leaving in the Spring of 1942. In the week he worked as a haulage hand at Dearne Valley Colliery for the next six years and on a Saturday afternoons played centre-forward with Houghton Sports, a team then competing in the Barnsley Nelson League. Short joined Wolverhampton Wanderers from non-league Wath Wanderers in the Spring of 1948. He became captain of the Wolves "A" team and made his league debut for Wolves on 2 December 1950 against West Bromwich Albion and played a key role as Stan Cullis' side reached the FA Cup semi final in 1950–51 losing in a replay to Newcastle United. Short spent the next three seasons at Molineux making the right back position his own after Stan Cullis moved him from being an attacker. That said, Short played as a makeshift centre forward in January 1952 where he scored twice against Manchester City in the FA Cup. However injury saw him miss the remainder of the 1952–53 campaign and he played 27 times in 1953–54 as Wolves won the First Division title.

He left for Staffordshire rivals Stoke City on 9 June 1954 with Stoke aiming for a return to the top-flight. He played 31 times in 1954–55 as the "Potters" finished in 5th position with Short again being used as a backup forward scoring twice against Swansea Town on 13 November 1954. He played 33 times in 1955–56 as Stoke ended in a poor position of 13th and Short was given a free transfer to his hometown club Barnsley on 25 October 1956.Barnsley Chronicle - 27 October 1956. He was a regular for the "Tykes" for three seasons, making his debut at Oakwell against Liverpool on 27 October 1956 in a 4-1 home win. He retired from professional football through injury at the end of the 1959–60 season.

After retirement Short went back to the mining industry, working as a coal miner, and later on the pit top, becoming a foreman. He also worked as a scout for Wolves and was manager of Houghton Main WMC.
 
On 10 October 1976 after a playing in a charity football match in Wombwell between an ex Barnsley team and Charlie Williams XI, Short collapsed and blacked out. An ambulance was called and by the time it had arrived he had partly recovered and refused to go to hospital. But not longer after he collapsed again and it was recalled. Short was pronounced dead on arrival.Oakwell Heroes - David Watson (1990).

Career statistics
Source:

Honours
 Wolverhampton Wanderers
 Football League First Division champions: 1953–54

References

English footballers
Barnsley F.C. players
Stoke City F.C. players
Wolverhampton Wanderers F.C. players
English Football League players
1928 births
1976 deaths
Association football defenders